The 1999 Stockholm Open was an ATP men's tennis tournament played on hard courts and held at the Kungliga tennishallen in Stockholm, Sweden. It was the 31st edition of the event and part of the ATP World Series of the 1999 ATP Tour. The tournament was held from 8 November until 14 November 1999. First-seeded Thomas Enqvist won the singles title.

Finals

Singles

 Thomas Enqvist defeated  Magnus Gustafsson, 6–3, 6–4, 6–2

Doubles

 Piet Norval /  Kevin Ullyett defeated  Jan-Michael Gambill /  Scott Humphries, 7–5, 6–3

References

External links
  
  
 Association of Tennis Professionals (ATP) tournament profile

 
Stockholm Open
Stockholm Open
1999 in Swedish tennis
November 1999 sports events in Europe
1990s in Stockholm